Dr. Tara Chand is a former Provincial Minister of Balochistan.

Political Career 
Affiliated to the Balochistan National Party, Chand won election to the Provincial Assembly of Balochistan in 1997 from the solitary seat reserved for Hindus. He defeated Arjun Das Bugti, who had won the seat in the last three elections. His brother Nanak Singh, a Sikh convert, had been a local politician too.

In July 2000, Chand fled Pakistan; he cited incessant harassment from local law enforcement after refusing to join the party floated by Pervez Musharraf.

References

Balochistan MPAs 1997–1999
Living people
Pakistani Hindus
Year of birth missing (living people)